

Helmut Friebe (4 November 1894 – 14 January 1970) was a German general in the Wehrmacht of Nazi Germany during World War II who commanded the LXIV Army Corps. He was a recipient of the Knight's Cross of the Iron Cross. He took up his command in Crete in May 1944 after the kidnap of General Kreipe by Patrick Leigh Fermor and Bill Stanley Moss working with Cretan andartes.

Awards and decorations

 Knight's Cross of the Iron Cross on 13 August 1941 as Oberst and commander of Infanterie-Regiment 164

References

Citations

Bibliography

 

1894 births
1970 deaths
People from Namysłów
People from the Province of Silesia
Lieutenant generals of the German Army (Wehrmacht)
German Army personnel of World War I
Reichswehr personnel
Recipients of the Gold German Cross
Recipients of the Knight's Cross of the Iron Cross
German prisoners of war in World War II held by the United States
Prussian Army personnel
Recipients of the clasp to the Iron Cross, 1st class